Jamie Wilmot (born 17 March 1953) is an Australian sailor. He competed in the Flying Dutchman event at the 1984 Summer Olympics.

Wilmot was Australian champion in the Fireball dinghy class in 1972–1973 and finished second in the 1974 World Fireball Championships.

References

External links
 

1953 births
Living people
Australian male sailors (sport)
Olympic sailors of Australia
Sailors at the 1984 Summer Olympics – Flying Dutchman
Sailors from Sydney